Tyler Locklear (born November 24, 2000) is an American professional baseball player in the Seattle Mariners organization of Major League Baseball. A utility infielder, and power hitter, Locklear is known for the accolades he achieved during his redshirt freshman year with VCU. Locklear was the first player in the history of the conference to win both the Atlantic 10 Conference Player and Rookie of the Year in the same season, while also attaining freshman and national All-American honors. Locklear was selected in the Second Round of the 2022 Major League Baseball draft.

Early life 
Locklear grew up in Abingdon, Maryland, northeast of the Baltimore metropolitan area, where he played high school baseball for Archbishop Curley High School. At Archbishop Curley, Locklear was named a 2018 Under Armour All-American, and earned All-Conference, State, and Metro honors, earning a .500 batting average during his senior year. Upon graduation, Locklear was ranked as the fifth best player to come out of Maryland.

College 
Locklear became an immediate starter for VCU ahead of his freshman season. During the 2020 NCAA Division I baseball season, Locklear appeared in all 15 games for the Rams, earning himself eight runs batted in, and scoring 15 total runs. The season prematurely ended in mid-March 2020 due to the onset of the COVID-19 pandemic. As a result, Locklear was redshirted and retained four more years of collegiate eligibility. 

During his redshirt freshman season, Locklear helped the Rams earn a 38–16 record, their best since 2015, an Atlantic 10 regular season and a conference tournament championship, as well as a two-seed berth in the Starkville Regional of the 2021 NCAA Division I baseball tournament, their highest seeding in the tournament since 2001. Locklear the Atlantic 10 in runs (69), RBIs (66), on-base percentage (.515), and walks (46), all marks that rank in the top 10 in VCU history for a single season. Additionally, Locklear hit 16 home runs, which was a VCU freshman record, the second-most in a single season in program history, and tied for the most in the Atlantic 10 during the 2021 season. Locklear earned three A-10 Rookie of the Week honors for the season.

Upon the conclusion of the 2021 NCAA Division I baseball season, Locklear achieved numerous conference and national recognition. Locklear was named to the Atlantic 10 All-Rookie Team, All-Atlantic 10 team, All-State team, ABCA Atlantic All-Region First Team, and was named a freshman All-American by Collegiate Baseball, Baseball America, and the NCBWA. Locklear earned national All-American honors by Collegiate Baseball (third-team), NCBWA (second-team), Baseball America (second-team), and the American Baseball Coaches Association (first-team).

He collected three individual honors including the VaSID Rookie of the Year (best college baseball freshman in Virginia), the Atlantic 10 Rookie of the Year, and the Atlantic 10 Player of the Year. 

After the 2021 season, he played collegiate summer baseball with the Orleans Firebirds of the Cape Cod Baseball League, and received the league's 10th player award.

Ahead of his redshirt sophomore year, Locklear was included on the 55-player preseason watchlist for the Golden Spikes Award. He was also named a preseason All-American by Collegiate Baseball, D1Baseball, and Perfect Game.

Professional career 
The Seattle Mariners selected Locklear 58th overall in the 2022 Major League Baseball draft. He made his debut with the Single-A Modesto Nuts that same year.

References

External links 
 Tyler Locklear at Baseball-Reference.com
 Tyler Locklear at VCU Athletics

2000 births
Living people
All-American college baseball players
Baseball players from Maryland
People from Abingdon, Maryland
VCU Rams baseball players
Orleans Firebirds players